Micronet may refer to:

 MicroNet, the original name of the CompuServe Information Service when it was released in 1979
 Micronet, a Meso-gamma to microscale network of surface weather observation stations spaced closer than a mesonet; typically covering metropolitan areas
 Micronet 800, an information provider (IP) on Prestel
 Micronet co., Ltd., a computer graphics and video game developer
 Enciclopedia Universal Micronet, a Spanish encyclopedia